Lloyd  A. Demetrius is an American mathematician and theoretical biologist at the Department of Organismic and Evolutionary biology, Harvard University. He is best known for the discovery of the concept evolutionary entropy, a statistical parameter that characterizes Darwinian fitness in models of evolutionary processes at various levels of biological organization – molecular, organismic and social. Evolutionary entropy, a generalization of the Gibbs-Boltzmann entropy in statistical thermodynamics, is the cornerstone of directionality theory, an analytical study of evolution by variation and selection. The theory has applications to: a) the development  of aging and the evolution of longevity; b) the origin and progression of age related diseases  such as cancer, and neurodegenerative disorders such as Alzheimer's  disease and Parkinson's disease; c) the evolution of cooperation and the spread of inequality.

Education
Born in Jamaica, he carried out his undergraduate studies in mathematics at the University of Cambridge, UK. He received his PhD in mathematical biology from the University of Chicago in 1967. He was then a postdoc at the University of California, Berkeley.

Career
Demetrius was a faculty member in a number of mathematics departments in the US from 1969–1979: the University of California, Berkeley; Brown University; Rutgers University; and a research scientist at the Max-Planck-Institute for Biophysical Chemistry, Göttingen (1980–1989) and the Max-Planck-Institute for Molecular Genetics, Berlin. Since 1990, he has been with the Department of Organismic and Evolutionary Biology, Harvard University, Cambridge, first as a visiting professor (1990–1992), and then as an associate in population genetics. He has held visiting professorships at MIT, University of Paris, and was an occupant of a Chaire Municipale, a distinguished visiting professorship at the University of Grenoble. His research includes the application of ergodic theory and  the theory of  dynamical systems to the study of evolutionary processes in biological and socio-economic systems. He has also pioneered the application of the methodology of quantum mechanics to the study of allometric relations between metabolic rate and generation time in cells. This work is the  mathematical basis for the analysis of cancer and neurodegenerative disorders as metabolic and bioenergetic diseases.

Evolutionary Entropy and Directionality Theory
The primary achievements of Demetrius are the discovery of the concept Evolutionary Entropy, and the development of Directionality Theory, a study of the collective properties and evolutionary dynamics of aggregates of organic matter – macromolecules, cells, higher organisms  - on the basis of their microscopic structure. 

Demetrius has shown that evolutionary entropy is related to the Thermodynamic Entropy of Ludwig Boltzmann and J.W. Gibbs, and Directionality Theory is the natural extension of Statistical Mechanics, the study of the collective behaviour of inorganic matter. 

The statistical parameter thermodynamic entropy, discovered by Boltzmann, describes the number of instantaneous microstates corresponding to a given macroscopic state. Evolutionary entropy is related to the multiplicity of trajectories characterizing the temporal progression of instantaneous microstates. 

Thermodynamic entropy describes the configuration of the instantaneous microstates, and ignores the effect of interparticle forces.  Evolutionary entropy describes the multiplicity of trajectories induced by interparticle forces and defined in terms of temporal progression of instantaneous microstates. The two statistical measures of cooperation are positively correlated when the number of microstates is large, effectively infinite. 

Statistical mechanics, one of the pillars of modern Physics, is concerned with deducing the thermodynamic properties of aggregates of inanimate matter from its microstructure. The theory, which is based on the statistical measure thermodynamic entropy, is restricted to the study of collective behaviour in physical and chemical systems whose cooperativity can be effectively measured by Thermodynamic Entropy. 
  
The Directionality Theory of Demetrius pertains to organic matter.  It is a phenomelogical and analytic theory based on evolutionary entropy as a measure of the cooperativity between the entities that compose the microstructure. It is an extension of the methodology of statistical mechanics to the study of collective and evolutionary behaviour in biological systems. 

A cornerstone of Directionality Theory is the Entropic Selection Principle. The changes in evolutionary entropy due to the process of variation and selection is determined by the resource endowment and the population size. 

A corollary of the Entropic Selection Principle is the Fundamental Theorem of Evolution:  

I a)   Evolutionary entropy increases when the resource endowment is scarce and constant

I b)   Evolutionary entropy decreases when the resource endowment is abundant and inconstant.

Directionality Theory and the Second Law of Thermodynamics
Demetrius has exploited the Entropic Selection Principle to solve a long-standing problem at the interface of Physics and Biology. 
Rudolf Clausius showed that the phenomenological fact: Heat flows spontaneously from hotter bodies to colder bodies – the Second Law of Thermodynamics – implies the existence of a property of matter which he called Entropy. 
The major achievement of Boltzmann was the statistical mechanics rationale of the Second Law. Boltzmann’s explanation was achieved by introducing the statistical parameter thermodynamic entropy, and relating this statistical measure of cooperativity with the Clausius entropy, a phenomenological construct. 
Boltzmann’s explanation of the Second Law was based on the celebrated theorem of Statistical Mechanics: 

II) In isolated systems, that is systems which are closed to the input of energy and matter, thermodynamic entropy increases. 

Demetrius has reconciled the Second Law of Thermodynamics, which pertains to energy transformation in inorganic matter, with the Fundamental Theorem of Evolution, which refers to energy transformation in organic matter. This is achieved by establishing that the directionality principle for evolutionary entropy and the Second Law coincide when the resource production rate that drives the evolutionary system tends to zero, and the number of degrees of freedom of the evolutionary system tends to infinity. This relation, Demetrius has shown, provides a conceptual framework for understanding the origin of life: the transition from an abiotic system, defined by inorganic matter – solids, liquids and gases –, to the emergence of organized chemical assemblies capable of Darwinian evolution.

See also
 Quantum Aspects of Life
 Caloric restriction
 Longevity

References

External links
 Demetrius' homepage Lloyd Demetrius
Demetrius on longevity

20th-century American mathematicians
21st-century American mathematicians
Alumni of the University of Cambridge
University of Chicago alumni
University of California, Berkeley alumni
Harvard University faculty
Living people
Year of birth missing (living people)